Mattias Skjelmose Jensen (born 26 September 2000) is a Danish cyclist, who currently rides for UCI WorldTeam . He joined the team for the 2021 season, having ridden for the team as a stagiaire in the latter half of 2020.

Major results

2017
 1st  Mountains classification, Course de la Paix Juniors
 2nd Road race, National Junior Road Championships
 5th Overall Internationale Niedersachsen-Rundfahrt der Junioren
2018
 1st  Overall Tour du Pays de Vaud
1st Stage 3b (ITT)
 2nd Overall Course de la Paix Juniors
 3rd Paris–Roubaix Juniors
2019
 3rd Fyen Rundt
 4th Time trial, National Under–23 Road Championships
2021
 5th Overall Tour de l'Ain
 6th Overall UAE Tour
 7th Overall Tour of Norway
1st  Young rider classification
 8th Overall Danmark Rundt
2022
 1st  Overall Tour de Luxembourg
1st  Young rider classification
1st Stage 4 (ITT)
 2nd Overall Tour de l'Ain
1st  Points classification
1st  Young rider classification
 3rd Time trial, National Road Championships
 3rd Overall Tour de la Provence
1st  Young rider classification
 3rd Overall Danmark Rundt
 3rd Overall Tour de Wallonie
 5th Overall Route d'Occitanie
 8th Clásica de San Sebastián
 10th Road race, UCI Road World Championships
2023
 2nd Overall Étoile de Bessèges
1st  Young rider classification
1st Stage 4
 3rd Faun-Ardèche Classic
 5th Overall Tour des Alpes-Maritimes et du Var
1st  Points classification
1st Stage 2
 6th La Drôme Classic

Grand Tour general classification results timeline

References

External links 

2000 births
Living people
Danish male cyclists
Cyclists from Copenhagen